Dead Man's Pop is a box set by The Replacements released by Rhino Entertainment on September 27, 2019. The box set includes a remix of the band's 1989 album, Don't Tell a Soul known as Don't Tell a Soul Redux, mixed by the album's original producer, Matt Wallace. Also included is a disc of rarities and unreleased tracks called We Know the Night: Rare and Unreleased which contains early versions of songs from the Don't Tell a Soul album and songs recorded with singer Tom Waits. The last two discs are a live album called The Complete Inconcerated Live, which expands upon the 1989 promotional EP, Inconcerated Live. The show was recorded at the University of Wisconsin-Milwaukee on June 2, 1989.

On July 23, 2019, the band released the first track, a remixed version of "Talent Show."

On August 16, 2019, the band released the second track, the Bearsville recording of "Achin' to Be."

The band's biographist Bob Mehr received the Best Album Notes trophy at the 63rd Annual Grammy Awards in 2021 for his liner notes on Dead Man's Pop.

Track listing

Charts

References 

2019 compilation albums
Albums produced by Matt Wallace
The Replacements (band) compilation albums
Rhino Entertainment compilation albums